Kysyl-Syr is the name of several inhabited localities in the Sakha Republic, Russia.

Urban localities
Kysyl-Syr, Vilyuysky District, Sakha Republic, an urban-type settlement in Vilyuysky District

Rural localities
Kysyl-Syr, Namsky District, Sakha Republic, a selo in Khomustakhsky 1-y Rural Okrug of Namsky District